Ciliopagurus obesus is a fossil species of hermit crab, described from Rupelian (Oligocene) sediments at Sint-Niklaas, Belgium.

References

Hermit crabs
Oligocene crustaceans
Prehistoric Malacostraca
Fossils of Belgium
Crustaceans described in 2003